Mia Rose Frampton (born March 10, 1996) is an American actress. She is known for her role as Becca Keeler, the younger sister of Payson Keeler, in the ABC Family teen drama Make It or Break It, and for her role as Bridgette in the Lifetime television movie A Teacher's Obsession.

Early life
Frampton was born in Nashville, Tennessee to musician Peter Frampton and Tina Elfers. She has one half sibling, through her mother, named Tiffany Wiest, and two half siblings, Jade and Jullian Frampton, from her father's previous marriage. She is the namesake of a ballad co-written by her father and Kimmie Rhodes off her father's 2003 album, Now, entitled "Mia Rose".

Filmography

References

External links
 
 
 http://www.enquirer.com/editions/2001/02/04/tem_no_fade_in_framptons.html

1996 births
Living people
American people of English descent
Actresses from Nashville, Tennessee
American child actresses
American film actresses
American television actresses
21st-century American actresses
Peter Frampton